This is a List of Buffyverse comics including different categories of different types of publications.

Categories

Buffy comics 

These were published by Dark Horse, originally in comic format but then gathered into volumes of trade paperbacks. They were published from 1998 until 2004. A small number of Buffy comics have not been included in trade paperbacks. These include the comics: Giles, Jonathan, and Reunion. The cover art of the individual comic covers can be found here. Dark Horse, under the guidance of Joss Whedon, reinstated the series in 2007 as a canonical continuation of the series.

Angel comics 

Dark Horse published two Angel comic series, the first of which was halted after 17 issues while the second lasted only four issues. Since June 2005, IDW have published a 17-issue limited series, a spin-off ongoing series as well as several miniseries and one shots with Angel characters.

Tales of the Vampires 

This comprises an anthology of short stories written by Joss Whedon, Jane Espenson, and other writers of the Buffy TV shows. Each story tells the tale of one or more Buffyverse vampires.

Tales of the Slayers 

This is an anthology of short stories written by Joss Whedon, Jane Espenson, and others. Like the prose short stories, each of these surrounds a different slayer from the past.

Unofficial parody 
There has been a sexually explicit satirical graphic novel, Boffy the Vampire Layer, which is not officially licensed as Buffy merchandise by 20th Century Fox. It was published by Eros Graphic Albums in 2002.

Canonical issues

Buffy comics are not usually considered by fans as canonical. However, unlike fanfiction, overviews summarizing their story, written early in the writing process, were "approved" by both Fox and Joss Whedon (or his office), and the books were therefore later published as official Buffy merchandise.

Chronology

Ancient

These tales take place from ancient times up until 1900.

Modern
These Buffyverse tales take place from 1900 to 1995.

Buffy season 1
These Buffyverse tales take place around Buffy Season 1 (from spring 1996 up until spring 1997).

Buffy season 2
These tales take place during Buffy Season 2 (from autumn 1997 up until spring 1998).

Buffy season 3
These tales take place during Buffy Season 3 (from autumn 1998 up until spring 1999).

Buffy season 4 / Angel season 1
These Buffyverse tales take place during Buffy Season 4, and Angel Season 1 (from autumn 1999 up until spring 2000).

Buffy season 5 / Angel season 2
These Buffyverse tales take place during Buffy Season 5, and Angel Season 2 (from autumn 2000 up until spring 2001).

Buffy season 6 / Angel season 3
These Buffyverse tales take place around Buffy Season 6, and Angel Season 3 (from autumn 2001 up until spring 2002).

Buffy season 7 / Angel season 4
These Buffyverse tales take place around Buffy Season 7, and Angel Season 4 (from autumn 2002 up until spring 2003).

Angel Season 5
These Buffyverse tales take place around Angel Season 5 (from spring 2003 up until spring 2004).

Buffy Season Eight / Angel: After the Fall
These Buffyverse tales take place after Angel Season 5.

Note: canon = bold, non-canon = italic

Buffy Season Nine / Angel & Faith

After season 8.

Comics by writer
(w/) = Collaboration with another writer (or other writers).

Amber Benson – The Innocent, Willow & Tara (w/)
Chris Boal – Autumnal (w/)
Dan Brereton – Dust Waltz, Uninvited Guests (w/)
Chynna Clugston-Major – Food Chain (w/)
Peter David – Spike: Old Times, Illyria: Spotlight, Spike vs Dracula
Ben Edlund – Taking Care of Business
Jane Espenson – Presumption, Broken Bottle of Djinn, 1997, Father, Dust Bowl, Spot the Vampire, Jonathan, Haunted, Reunion
Jay Faerber – Connor: Spotlight
Tom Fassbender – Out of the Woodwork (w/), Food Chain (w/), Ugly Little Monsters (w/), Autumnal (w/), False Memories (w/), Death of Buffy (w/), Creatures of Habit (w/)
David Fury – The Glittering World
Drew Goddard – The Problem with Vampires, Antique
Christopher Golden – Earthly Possessions (w/), Strange Bedfellows,  Hunting Ground (w/), Strange Bedfellows (w/), Past Lives (w/), Willow & Tara (w/), Oz, Giles (w/), Spike & Dru (w/), The Origin, Blood of Carthage, Food Chain (w/), Play With Fire, Angel: The Hollower, Chaos Bleeds comic prequel (w/)
Dan Jolley – Gunn: Spotlight
Rebecca Rand Kirshner – Sonnenblume
Paul Lee – Hoopy the Bear
Scott Lobdell – Note from the Underground, Viva Las Buffy (w/), Slayer Interrupted (w/)
Sam Loeb – Some Like it Hot
Brian Lynch – Spike: Asylum
Jeff Mariotte – The Curse, Old Friends, Doyle: Spotlight
James Marsters – Spike & Dru (w/)
Brett Matthews – Jack, Dames, Numb
Fabian Nicieza – Death of Buffy (w/), Viva Las Buffy (w/), Slayer Interrupted (w/), A Stake to the Heart
Jim Pascoe – Out of the Woodwork (w/), Food Chain (w/), Ugly Little Monsters (w/), Autumnal (w/), False Memories (w/), Death of Buffy (w/), Creatures of Habit (w/)
Doug Petrie – Broken Bottle of Djinn, 1937, Ring of Fire, Double Cross, Bad Dog
Jamie S. Rich – Food Chain (w/)
Thomas E. Sniegoski – Earthly Possessions (w/), Strange Bedfellows (w/), Hunting Ground (w/), Past Lives (w/), Giles (w/), Chaos Bleeds comic prequel (w/)
Scott Tipton – Spike: Old Wounds, Spike: Lost and Found, Wesley: Spotlight
Andi Watson – Remaining Sunlight, Uninvited Guests (w/), The Final Cut, Bad Blood, Crash Test Demons, Pale Reflections
Joss Whedon – Prologue, Righteous, Tales, Tales of the Vampires, Stacey, Long Night's Journey, Fray

Footnotes

External links
BBC Cult Television - Buffy ecomics A number of Buffy comics are available free online from the BBC.
The Unofficial Comic Book Guide to Buffy the Vampire Slayer

Buffy Season 8 comics
Whedonesque.com - Whedon announces he will be writing Buffy comics in December 2005
Silverbulletcomicbooks.com - All the Rage (July 2006)
ComicsContinuum.com - Georges Jeanty talks Buffy
ComicsContinuum.com - Dark Horse says Buffy comics due in March 2007
Popwatch.ew.com - First Look: The new 'Buffy' comic
Panels from Buffy Season 8 at DreadCentral.com

Buffyverse